WWZY ("107.1 The Boss") is a classic rock music formatted radio station licensed to Long Branch, New Jersey. The station is simulcast on 99.7 WBHX Tuckerton, New Jersey.

History

1960–1996 
WWZY first went on the air on June 1, 1960 as WRLB "Radio Long Branch". At the time, the station's owner was afforded the possibility of broadcasting with 50,000 watts, but he declined, thinking that FM radio had limited potential. Therefore, the station signed on with 3,000 watts from a tower located in Long Branch, New Jersey. The studios were located adjacent to the tower. WWZY still uses the tower site, although the studios are now in Neptune, New Jersey. When the Long Branch 107.1 did not utilize 50,000 watts, the Federal Communications Commission subsequently assigned 107.1s to Briarcliff Manor, New York (north of New York City); Belvidere, New Jersey (near Stroudsburg, Pennsylvania); and Hampton Bays, New York (Long Island). These area 107.1s would later haunt the Long Branch allocation with interference in fringe areas.

Throughout the 1960s and 1970s, WRLB was a "full-service" station, broadcasting big-band music, high school sports and local news. An Italian program aired on Sunday. Competition was mainly from the Asbury Park Press' radio station, WJLK-AM-FM, which aired similar full-service programming.

In 1968, WRLB revamped its programming continuing with adult "middle of the road" music from 6 a.m. until midnight when it switched to rock/top40 music hosted and pioneered by Charlie Roberts who was the first disk jockey in New Jersey to play rock on a commercial FM radio station; the program was called The Subway (an homage to Dick Summer at WBZ in Boston who was Charlie's mentor when he was at Boston University).  His first song selection was "Road Runner" by Junior Walker and the All Stars.  On occasion, he would have live in-studio guests including the progressive rock band Vanilla Fudge.  His weather guy/sidekick was "Tommy Metro" who was also the station's chief engineer, Tom Tcimpidis.

In 1981, WRLB was sold to Monmouth Broadcasting and became contemporary hit radio, WWUU (known on-air as "U 107"). The station was programmed as contemporary hit radio, but without a strong local presence due to automation. The station was sold again to Jonathan and Elizabeth Hoffman (under the similar name "Mammoth Broadcasting"), and in 1982 became WMJY (Y-107), featuring live local talent playing the hits. Liners for the rechristened station highlighted the station's local presence by touting "The New Live Y-107". Radio personality Sean "Hollywood" Hamilton spent a short time doing afternoon drive at Y-107 in early 1982 before moving onto WKTU in New York City.

At first, Y-107 maintained You 107's CHR format, but within a few years, Y-107 was a rock station, using the slogan "Rock Hits Home", with special programming on Sundays spotlighting new-age music, blues, psychedelic music, and The Beatles. Disc jockeys at Y-107 in its rock days included John Ford, Linda Jordan, T.J. Brustowicz, Bobbi Stewart, Garrick Hart, Willobee (now Program Director/Operations Manager & afternoon host at KVNV - NV89 in Reno, Nevada), Lauren Pressley, Jason Watt and Thom Morrera. Ian Case hosted a morning show that combined music and comedy bits. Newscasters included Doug Doyle, Rhonda Schaffler (later of CNN) and Matt Ward.

In late 1988, Mammoth sold WMJY to K&K Broadcasting. At the time of its purchase, K&K operated two radio stations in Erie, Pennsylvania. Word had gotten out that a format change was in the works. On January 19, 1989, mention had been made on the air of a rally to be held the following afternoon at the station's studios in downtown Long Branch to save Y-107's rock format. In the early morning hours of January 20, 1989, K&K sent a security guard to remove overnight announcer T.J. Brustowicz from the premises and padlock the doors. The entire staff was fired (many reading of their job loss in the paper that morning), though some announcers and support personnel were eventually hired back. K&K then temporarily instituted a satellite-driven hard rock format called "Z-Rock." Many of WMJY's listeners objected to the firing of the local DJs and the hard-rock format, and petitioned K&K to change it back to classic rock. The new owners refused.

In May 1989, WMJY changed to a local, soft-adult contemporary format called "SeaView 107 FM." The new format featured soft-rock artists with a heavy dose of 1960s and 1970s oldies. Call letters changed to WZVU in June 1989.

WZVU "SeaView 107" was a ratings success in the Monmouth-Ocean ratings, beating longtime rival WJLK-FM within the first year. The station began to lean heavily on oldies, first featuring "all-oldies weekends."

The original General Manager in 1989 for WZVU was Gary Spurgeon, GSM Don Dalesio and PD Brad Kelly.

Unfortunately, WZVU's corporate parent, K&K Broadcasting began to encounter financial problems. In 1992, all of the local DJs were terminated, and the station switched to a satellite-delivered oldies format. Curiously, this was the same satellite format that was aired on WJLK/1310 in Asbury Park. By this time, the Asbury Park Press had sold WJLK-AM-FM to D&F Broadcasting.

In early 1994, GM Jim Davis (former Drake jock "Big Bob" Evans on WOR-FM) launched Oldies 107.1. Bob Steele was the second program director. Airstaff included Rocky D, Jersey Judi Franco, Big Joe Henry, Tommy Dean, Bobby Ryan, Captain Jack Aponte, Mark Lee and Ed Healy. Innovative specialty shows were on weekends such as All Request Radio and the Sunday Night Train with Tommy Dean and Bobby Ryan.

1996–2003 

In mid-1996 the station was sold to Big City Radio. On December 5, 1996, the station became part of the Big City Radio trimulcast (and eventual quadcast) with other 107.1 stations, WRGX in Briarcliff Manor, New York and WWHB Hampton Bays, New York. WZVU and the other two multicast stations switched formats to country, known as "New Country Y-107." Call letters of the Long Branch station were changed to WWZY. Later, WRNJ-FM the 107.1 in Belvidere, New Jersey was added to make Y-107 a four-station "quadcast."

On May 7, 2002, the "Y-107" quadcast ended the country format, and after a day of stunting with construction sounds, the quadcast flipped to a tropical music format as "Rumba 107". The format was ill-suited to the quadcast suburban signals, so the WWZY transmitter was moved to a tower in the Belford section of Middletown Township, New Jersey, in an attempt to improve its coverage of New York City. At the end of the year, Big City Radio filed for bankruptcy and sold the quadcast to Nassau Broadcasting, who broke up the quadcast and sold the individual stations. WWZY was then purchased by Press Communications LLC, moved back to the Long Branch tower, became The Breeze on June 30, 2003, and started simulcasting on WBHX FM 99.7 in Tuckerton, New Jersey.

2003–2013
From 2003 to 2013, the station aired an adult contemporary format, and was branded "The Breeze". The station was simulcast on 99.7 WBHX in Tuckerton, New Jersey from June 30, 2003 to November 1, 2015. The WBHX transmitter is located on Long Beach Island in the town of Beach Haven, New Jersey. The station is also played throughout most of the day in southern Ocean County on WCAT-TV, the public-access television cable TV channel serving Pinelands Regional High School.

2013–present 
WWZY kept the Breeze branding until the fall of 2013 when it rebranded as 107.1 FM A Music Radio Station, continuing with the simulcast of WBHX. On July 1, 2014, 107.1 and 99.7 rebranded as Fun 107.1, shifting to a hot AC format. The station featured Pork Roll & Eggs, Chelsea, Tom Farinaro, and Ali as its personalities, and was another place on the dial to hear the same teen-friendly Top 40 acts that are played on other stations, such as Taylor Swift, Maroon 5, Meghan Trainor, Ariana Grande, and One Direction. "107.1 FM" ended the WBHX simulcast on November 1, 2015.

On March 1, 2017, WWZY began teasing a "Big Announcement" on air and on their Facebook page to occur the following Friday, the 3rd, at 5PM. At that time, after playing "Bye Bye Bye" by *Nsync, General Manager Don Dalesio and PD Jeff Rafter launched "107.1 The Boss".  They also revived the simulcast on WBHX, giving the format almost full market coverage over Monmouth and Ocean County.  The only mention of 99.7 is at the top-of-the-hour station ID. The first song on The Boss was "We Will Rock You" by Queen. On March 3, 2017, the station again began to be simulcast on 99.7 WBHX.
Current Morning Show: 
Robby and Rochelle in the Morning

Former logo

References

External links

WZY
Radio stations established in 1960
Classic rock radio stations in the United States
1960 establishments in New Jersey
Long Branch, New Jersey